Maelstrom is a video game developed by Andrew Welch, released as shareware in November 1992 for Mac OS. The game is an enhanced clone of Atari, Inc.'s 1979  arcade game with a visual style similar to the Atari Games 1987 sequel, .  was released when there were few action games for the high-resolution color displays of the Macintosh, so it garnered much interest, despite the dated concept, and led to the creation of Ambrosia Software.

The game was later released as free and open-source software, resulting in ports for other platforms.

Gameplay 
 is played in a 2D overview in a section of space. The object of the game is to reach the highest score possible by shooting asteroids with a plasma cannon from a spaceship. The ship can move in any direction across the screen and also has a limited amount of shield. The player may also pick up power-ups and encounter unusual objects and enemies throughout the game.

Development 
 was created using THINK C and uses 18,000 lines of C code with 9,000 lines of inline assembly language.

Reception 
In 1993, Maelstrom won "Best New Macintosh Product" in the "Shareware Industry Awards for Best Game," as well as receiving other awards.

Legacy
Welch gave the source code to Sam Lantinga, who created a SDL port and released it in 1995. It included networked multiplayer. 

In 1999 Ambrosia Software released Latinga's version 3.0 as open-source software under the terms of the GNU General Public License (GPL).
In 2010, Andrew Welch and Ian Gilman released the game's contents under the free Creative Commons license Attribution, which makes  completely free and open-source software.

References

External links 

 Official Page
 Maelstrom 3.0 on libsdl.org

1992 video games
Video game clones
Ambrosia Software games
Open-source video games
Multidirectional shooters
Linux games
Classic Mac OS games
Commercial video games with freely available source code
Creative Commons-licensed video games
Video games developed in the United States